Justice Antony Dominic (born 30 May 1956) was the Chief Justice at the High Court of Kerala. The High Court, headquartered at Ernakulam, is the highest court in the Indian state of Kerala and in the Union Territory of Lakshadweep. Currently he is the Chairman of the State Human Rights Commission of Kerala.

Education
Dominic obtained his degree in law from S.D.M. Law College, Mangalore.

Career
He started his practice in Munsiff's Court and JFCM, Kanjirappally in 1981. Later, Dominic shifted to Kerala High Court at Ernakulam in 1986. He acquired extensive experience in Company, Labour and Constitutional laws. Dominic was appointed Additional Judge of the Kerala High Court in January 2007 and promoted to be a Permanent Judge in December 2008. He was elevated to the post of Chief Justice, High Court of Kerala from 6 February 2018 and his tenure ended on 29 May 2018. Currently he is the Chairman of State Human Rights Commission of Kerala.

References

Judges of the Kerala High Court
Living people
Malayali people
1956 births
21st-century Indian judges
20th-century Indian lawyers
Scholars from Mangalore